Route 281 is a 75 km two-lane north/south highway in the Chaudière-Appalaches region in the province of Quebec, Canada. Its northern terminus is in St-Michel at the junction of Route 132 and its southern terminus is close to Saint-Camille-de-Lellis at the junction of Route 204.

Towns along Route 281

 Saint-Camille-de-Lellis
 Saint-Magloire
 Saint-Philémon
 Armagh
 Saint-Raphaël
 La Durantaye
 Saint-Michel-de-Bellechasse

See also
 List of Quebec provincial highways

References

External links 
 Provincial Route Map (Courtesy of the Quebec Ministry of Transportation) 
 Route 281 on Google Maps

281